Jean-Dominique Merchet (born 26 October 1959 in Besançon) is a French journalist working for the daily newspaper L'Opinion. He specializes in strategy, defense and military issues and often appears on radio and TV shows, notably C'est dans L'air on TV5, as a commentator.

Biography 
Merchet started his journalistic career as a columnist for the monthly Le Monde Diplomatique. In the 90s he joined the daily Libération , where he wrote on defense topics. Since July 2007, he has been publishing a professional blog, Secret Défense . He left Libération after the summer of 2010 to join the weekly Marianne where he held the position of deputy editor responsible for international affairs. In July 2013 he joined the newly established L'Opinion as a correspondent for diplomatic and defense issues.

He is an alumnus of the Institute of Advanced Studies in National Defence (49th session).

Merchet notably  authored a biography of Caroline Aigle, the first French female fighter pilote, and Mourir pour l'Afghanistan, a book on the Afghanistan War.

Works 
 Les Commandos Marine, co-authored with Marie Babey (photos), France Delory, Paris, 1999
 Caroline Aigle, vol brisé, Jacob-Duvernet, Paris, 2007
 Mourir pour l'Afghanistan, Jacob-Duvernet, Paris, 2008
 Défense européenne, la grande illusion, Larousse, coll. "À dire vrai", Paris, 2009

External links
 Secret Défense   at Libération (14 July 2007 - 29 October 2010)
 Secret Défense   at Marianne (29 October 2010 - 5 June 2013)
 Secret Défense  at L'Opinion (from 5 June 2013)

French journalists
Writers from Besançon
Living people
1959 births
French male non-fiction writers